FEI Nations Cup of Canada may refer to:

 2010 FEI Nations Cup of Canada
 2011 FEI Nations Cup of Canada